In the physical sciences, the term spectrum was introduced first into optics by Isaac Newton in the 17th century, referring to the range of colors observed when white light was dispersed through a prism. 
Soon the term referred to a plot of light intensity or power as a function of frequency or wavelength, also known as a spectral density plot.

Later it expanded to apply to other waves, such as sound waves and sea waves that could also be measured as a function of frequency (e.g., noise spectrum, sea wave spectrum). It has also been expanded to more abstract "signals", whose power spectrum can be analyzed and processed. The term now applies to any signal that can be measured or decomposed along a continuous variable, such as energy in electron spectroscopy or mass-to-charge ratio in mass spectrometry. Spectrum is also used to refer to a graphical representation of the signal as a function of the dependent variable.

Electromagnetic spectrum

Electromagnetic spectrum refers to the full range of all frequencies of electromagnetic radiation and also to the characteristic distribution of electromagnetic radiation emitted or absorbed by that particular object. Devices used to measure an electromagnetic spectrum are called spectrograph or spectrometer. The visible spectrum is the part of the electromagnetic spectrum that can be seen by the human eye. The wavelength of visible light ranges from 390 to 700 nm. The absorption spectrum of a chemical element or chemical compound is the spectrum of frequencies or wavelengths of incident radiation that are absorbed by the compound due to electron transitions from a lower to a higher energy state. The emission spectrum refers to the spectrum of radiation emitted by the compound due to electron transitions from a higher to a lower energy state.

Light from many different sources contains various colors, each with its own brightness or intensity.  A rainbow, or prism, sends these component colors in different directions, making them individually visible at different angles.  A graph of the intensity plotted against the frequency (showing the brightness of each color) is the frequency spectrum of the light.  When all the visible frequencies are present equally, the perceived color of the light is white, and the spectrum is a flat line.  Therefore, flat-line spectra in general are often referred to as white, whether they represent light or another type of wave phenomenon (sound, for example, or vibration in a structure).

In radio and telecommunications, the frequency spectrum can be shared among many different broadcasters.  The radio spectrum is the part of the electromagnetic spectrum corresponding to frequencies lower below 300 GHz, which corresponds to wavelengths longer than about 1 mm. The microwave spectrum corresponds to frequencies between 300 MHz (0.3 GHz) and 300 GHz and wavelengths between one meter and one millimeter. Each broadcast radio and TV station transmits a wave on an assigned frequency range, called a channel.  When many broadcasters are present, the radio spectrum consists of the sum of all the individual channels, each carrying separate information, spread across a wide frequency spectrum.  Any particular radio receiver will detect a single function of amplitude (voltage) vs. time.  The radio then uses a tuned circuit or tuner to select a single channel or frequency band and demodulate or decode the information from that broadcaster.  If we made a graph of the strength of each channel vs. the frequency of the tuner, it would be the frequency spectrum of the antenna signal.

In astronomical spectroscopy, the strength, shape, and position of absorption and emission lines, as well as the overall spectral energy distribution of the continuum, reveal many properties of astronomical objects.  Stellar classification is the categorisation of stars based on their characteristic electromagnetic spectra.  The spectral flux density is used to represent the spectrum of a light-source, such as a star.  

In radiometry and colorimetry (or color science more generally), the spectral power distribution (SPD) of a light source is a measure of the power contributed by each frequency or color in a light source. The light spectrum is usually measured at points (often 31) along the visible spectrum, in wavelength space instead of frequency space, which makes it not strictly a spectral density. Some spectrophotometers can measure increments as fine as one to two nanometers. the values are used to calculate other specifications and then plotted to show the spectral attributes of the source. This can be helpful in analyzing the color characteristics of a particular source.

Mass spectrum

A plot of ion abundance as a function of mass-to-charge ratio is called a mass spectrum.  It can be produced by a mass spectrometer instrument. The mass spectrum can be used to determine the quantity and mass of atoms and molecules. Tandem mass spectrometry is used to determine molecular structure.

Energy spectrum

In physics, the energy spectrum of a particle is the number of particles or intensity of a particle beam as a function of particle energy. Examples of techniques that produce an energy spectrum are alpha-particle spectroscopy, electron energy loss spectroscopy, and mass-analyzed ion-kinetic-energy spectrometry.

Discrete spectrum

In physics, particularly in quantum mechanics, some differential operators have discrete spectra, with gaps between values. Common cases include the Hamiltonian and the angular momentum operator.

Displacement
Oscillatory displacements, including vibrations, can also be characterized spectrally. 

 For water waves, see wave spectrum and tide spectrum.

  Sound and non-audible acoustic waves can also be characterized in terms of its spectral density, for example, timbre and musical acoustics.

Measurement

In acoustics, a spectrogram is a visual representation of the frequency spectrum of sound as a function of time or another variable.

A source of sound can have many different frequencies mixed.  A musical tone's timbre is characterized by its harmonic spectrum.  Sound in our environment that we refer to as noise includes many different frequencies.  When a sound signal contains a mixture of all audible frequencies, distributed equally over the audio spectrum, it is called white noise.

The spectrum analyzer is an instrument which can be used to convert the sound wave of the musical note into a visual display of the constituent frequencies.  This visual display is referred to as an acoustic spectrogram. Software based audio spectrum analyzers are available at low cost, providing easy access not only to industry professionals, but also to academics, students and the hobbyist.  The acoustic spectrogram generated by the spectrum analyzer provides an acoustic signature of the musical note.  In addition to revealing the fundamental frequency and its overtones, the spectrogram is also useful for analysis of the temporal attack, decay, sustain, and release of the musical note.

See also

References

Concepts in physics
Light